Darius Harper (born October 10, 1997) is an American football offensive tackle for the Birmingham Stallions of the United States Football League (USFL). He played college basketball at Miami (OH) and college football at Cincinnati.

College basketball

2016-17
Before playing football, Harper played college basketball at Miami (Ohio) after graduating from high school. He started 14 of 30 games and totaled 87 points, 64 rebounds, 7 steals, 2 assists and 8 blocks in 360 minutes.

2017-18
During his second season at Miami (Ohio), Harper did not see as much playing time. He started no games and totaled 4 points and 4 rebounds in just 23 minutes.

College football

2018
In 2018, Harper transferred to Cincinnati where he played in 2 games.

2019
In his second year, Harper started 8 out of 14 games and helped his team win the American Athletic Conference East Division Championship. He was also named to the 2019 AAC All-Academic Team.

2020
In his last year, Harper started 10 games and helped his offensive line become a semifinalist for the Joe Moore Award. He also earned his bachelor's degree in criminal justice and an Honorable Mention All-AAC.

Profesional Career

Los Angeles Chargers
Harper was signed by the Los Angeles Chargers as an undrafted free agent on May 1, 2021. Harper was waived on August 30, 2021.

Birmingham Stallions
Harper was selected in the 5th round of the 2022 USFL Draft by the Birmingham Stallions.

References

Further reading

Living people
1997 births
Miami RedHawks men's basketball players
Cincinnati Bearcats football players
American football offensive tackles
Los Angeles Chargers players
Birmingham Stallions (2022) players